Sero or Siero is a village in Misraqawi Zone in Ethiopia near the Eritrean border.

Regional transport
Sero is located on Ethiopian Highway 15 in between Adigrat and Adwa.

History
The Ethiopian National Defense Force (ENDF) military base at Sero was one of the bases attacked during the 4 November Northern Command attacks that were considered by the federal Ethiopian government as the trigger for the 2020 Tigray conflict.

References

Populated places in the Tigray Region